Lepidium perfoliatum is a species of flowering plant in the mustard family known by the common names clasping pepperweed and perfoliate pepperwort. It is native to Europe and Asia and it can be found in other parts of the world as an introduced species.

This is an annual or biennial herb producing an erect stem to a maximum height near 60 centimeters. Leaves at the base of the plant are divided into linear lobes, while the leaves higher up on the stem are rounded to oval in shape and surround the stem.

References

External links

Jepson Manual Treatment
Photo gallery

perfoliatum
Flora of Asia
Flora of Europe
Plants described in 1753
Taxa named by Carl Linnaeus